The 2003–04 Druga HNL (also known as 2. HNL) season was the 13th season of Croatia's second level football since its establishment in 1992. The league was contested in two regional groups (North Division and South Division), with 12 clubs each.

North Division

First stage

Play-off Group

Play-out Group

South Division

First stage

Play-off Group

Play-out Group

Promotion play-off

Međimurje and Pula 1856, winners of the North and South Division, qualified for a two-legged promotion play-off, which took place on 12 and 16 May 2004. The tie ended in a 2–2 aggregate score and Pula 1856 won it after the penalty shootout ended 5–4 in their favor, thereby earning promotion to the Prva HNL for the following season.

However, Međimurje had another chance for promotion, as the losing team from the promotion play-off played another two-legged tie against the 11th placed team of Prva HNL, Cibalia. Međimurje won 4–2 on aggregate and was promoted to 2004–05 Prva HNL.

See also
2003–04 Prva HNL
2003–04 Croatian Cup

External links
2003–04 in Croatian Football at Rec.Sport.Soccer Statistics Foundation
Official website  

First Football League (Croatia) seasons
Cro
Drug